Indirect presidential elections were held in Nepal on 28 October 2015. Bidya Devi Bhandari of the Communist Party of Nepal (Unified Marxist–Leninist) was elected President, becoming Nepal's first female head of state.

Results

President
For the presidential election, one candidate needed to gather 299 votes. 549 out of 596 eligible lawmakers cast their votes.

Vice-President
The Vice-presidential election took place three days after the presidential election. After Dayaram Kandel (Nepal Pariwar Dal) Attahar Kamal Musalman (independent) withdrew their candidacies, two candidates remained. 547 out of 596 eligible lawmakers cast their votes.

References

Presidential elections in Nepal
President